Rule of seven may refer to

"The Magical Number Seven, Plus or Minus Two", a highly cited paper in psychology
The "half-your-age-plus-seven" rule
Rule of sevens, establishing age brackets for determining capacity to give informed assent or to commit crimes or torts